The voiced labiodental nasal is a type of consonantal sound. The IPA symbol is a lowercase letter m with a leftward hook protruding from the lower right of the letter.

It is doubted by some scholars that true closure can be made by a labiodental gesture because of gaps between the incisors, which for many speakers would allow air to flow during the occlusion. This is particularly pertinent considering that one of the Kukuya words with this consonant, means a 'gap between filed incisors,' a practice of the local people. The  might therefore be better characterized as a labiodental nasal approximant than as a nasal occlusive.

In the Angami language,  occurs as an allophone of  before . In Drubea,  is reported as an allophone of  before nasal vowels.

Features 

Features of the voiced labiodental nasal:

Occurrence 
Phonemic  is extremely rare.

See also 
 Index of phonetics articles

Notes

References

External links
 

Pulmonic consonants
Nasal consonants
Voiced consonants